Arcisate is a town and comune located in the province of Varese, in the Lombardy region of northern Italy. The celebrated Arcisate Treasure of Roman silverware was found in the town in the nineteenth century. It is now in the British Museum.

References

Cities and towns in Lombardy